Miskolc Airfield  was a small unpaved aerodrome in Miskolc, in the Borsod-Abaúj-Zemplén County of Hungary. It operated regular domestic flights until 1967, then served general aviation (gliding, parachuting, sightseeing) until 2022.

See also
 List of airports in Hungary

External links
 Airport information
 Operator's official site (Hungarian only)
 History of the airport (Hungarian only)

Airports in Hungary
Airport